The Hagerstown Suns were a Minor League Baseball team based in Hagerstown, Maryland. They were a member of the South Atlantic League and, from 2007 through 2020, were the Class A affiliate of the Washington Nationals. They played their home games at Municipal Stadium which was opened in 1930 and seats 4,600 people. The team mascot was Woolie, a giant woolly bear caterpillar.

History

Toronto Blue Jays (1993–2000) 
The ownership of the previous Double A Hagerstown Suns chose to move their existing Hagerstown franchise to Bowie as the Bowie Baysox.  Hagerstown would not go without, though. Winston Blenckstone immediately relocated his Myrtle Beach Hurricanes franchise in the Class A South Atlantic League (SAL) to Hagerstown after the 1992 season and promptly renamed them the Suns.

The change brought a competitive team to Hagerstown for the 1993 season. The offense got steady power production from Mike Coolbaugh, who led the team with 16 home runs. The best all-around hitter on the team proved to be D.J. Boston. Boston hit .315 with 13 home runs and 93 runs batted in (RBI). Those numbers were good enough to earn him league Most Valuable Player (MVP) honors. Two outfielders, Rickey Cradle and Jose Herrera, put together solid seasons at the plate for the Suns. Herrera hit .317 in 95 games, while Cradle belted 13 home runs. Brad Cornett led the team in earned run average (ERA), with a 2.40 mark, and also innings pitched, with 172.1. Silva went 12–4 with a 2.52 ERA in 142.2 innings. In that time frame, Silva struck out 161 batters.

In 1994, the Suns reached the playoffs for the first time since 1991. On offense, the team was led by former first round draft choice Shannon Stewart. Stewart hit .324 with 4 home runs and 25 RBI in an injury-shortened season. Tom Evans returned from the 1993 squad, hitting .273 with 13 home runs and 48 RBI in 95 games. The power was supplied by Lorenzo Delacruz and Ryan Jones, who hit 19 and 18 home runs, respectively. Jones also had a team leading 72 RBI. Edwin Hurtado went 11–2 with a 2.95 ERA in 33 games, 16 of which were starts. The bullpen was headlined by Steve Sinclair and Dave Sinnes. Sinclair appeared in 37 games out of the bullpen and picked up a total of 9 wins with 105 innings pitched. Sinclair only made one start for the Suns all year. Closer Sinnes tied for the South Atlantic League lead with 37 saves.

In 1995, veteran Jeff Ladd was the home run leader on the team. Ladd hit 19 home runs in 95 games before a promotion to Double-A Knoxville. That turned out to be Ladd's last professional season. Bobby Llanos hit 17 home runs and produced a team leading 63 RBI. The Suns got stable production behind the plate from Julio Mosquera. Mosquera hit .291 in 108 games for the team. Brian Smith pitched his way to a 9–1 record in 47 games out of the bullpen and picked up 21 saves along the way. He also had 101 strikeouts in 104 innings. Doug Meiners proved to be the Suns' best starter of the season, as he went 8–4 with a 2.99 ERA in 18 starts. Another highlight from the starting staff was Tom Davey, who went 4–1 with a 3.38 ERA in 8 starts.

The 1996 campaign was the Suns' first losing year in the SAL. First basemen Mike Whitlock led the team in home runs (20) and RBI (91) with a .252 batting average while drawing a franchise record 108 walks. He did this in 131 games at the age of 19, yet never played a game in the major leagues. Another player who displayed power was Craig Wilson. Wilson hit 11 home runs with 70 RBI while maintaining a .261 batting average. Craig Stone returned from the 1995 squad, batting .310 with 10 home runs and 35 RBI in 56 games. Mike Johnson won a staff-leading 11 games and also had a team-leading total of 162.2 innings pitched. He made his major league debut a season later with the Baltimore Orioles. Tom Davey won 10 games and had a 3.87 ERA in 26 starts.

In 1997, the offense was led by Luis Lopez, who put together one of the best individual years by a Sun ever. Lopez batted .358 with 11 home runs and 99 RBI. These numbers would give him SAL MVP honors. The pitching staff was led by Clint Lawrence, who won a team-leading 13 games in 26 starts. One pitcher who had a bizarre season was starter Gary Glover. Glover posted a 3.73 ERA and threw a team leading 173.2 innings. He, along with John Bale, tied for the team lead in strikeouts with 155. Despite these advantages, his overall record was 6–17. Those 17 losses set a franchise record.  The Suns finished in last place, 11 games behind first place Charleston (West Virginia).

The 1998 offense got power from catcher/first basemen Bobby Cripps. Cripps hit 29 home runs and also led the Suns with 88 RBI and threw out 47 percent of would-be base stealers in 56 games behind the plate. Mike Young batted .282 with 16 home runs and 86 RBI at second base. Two other future major league All Stars on the Suns that year were Vernon Wells and César Izturis. Wells batted .285 with 11 home runs and 65 RBI. Izturis meanwhile had a .262 average with a team-leading 20 stolen bases. John Sneed had one of the best seasons ever by a Suns pitcher, as he won a franchise record 16 games, while losing just 2, with a 2.56 ERA in 27 starts. He also collected 200 strikeouts in 161.1 innings pitched. Clayton Andrews returned from the 1997 squad and nearly matched Sneed's dominance. He went 10–7 with a 2.28 ERA and had 193 strikeouts in 162 innings pitched. The Suns closer was Jaron Seabury, who had a 1.65 ERA in 45 games with 17 saves. The Suns won the first-half division title and finished with the best record in the Northern Division. They made the playoffs and won in the first round, but did not advance to the championship because the league now had a three-round playoff format featuring 8 out of 14 teams. In the second round, the Suns would lose to the eventual league champion Capital City Bombers.

In 1999, Jay Gibbons was the best all-around hitter. In 71 games, Gibbons batted .305 with 16 home runs and 69 RBI. Second basemen Jorge Nunez batted .268 with 14 home runs and 61 RBI, while leading the team with 51 stolen bases. Outfielder Ryan Fleming hit .335 in 61 games. Tyler Thompson led the team with 17 homeruns and RBI with 81. Pasqual Coco went 9–1 in 14 starts with a 2.21 ERA. Scott Cassidy won a team-leading 13 games in 27 starts in 170.2 innings. He struck out 178 batters, leading the team. The Suns bullpen got a strong season from closer Jarrod Kingrey. Kingrey had 27 saves and 69 strikeouts in 61 innings.  he Suns made the playoffs by winning the first-half division title and wound up with the best overall record in the SAL. They were knocked out of the first round by their division rival, the Cape Fear Crocs. This was the last season that the SAL used a three division (North, Central, and South) format.

The Suns had a losing season in 2000. Reed Johnson hit .290 with 8 home runs and 70 RBI in 95 games. Kevin Cash led the team in home runs with 10, while also contributing 27 RBI in 59 games. He displayed great defense by throwing out 55 percent of potential base stealers. Shortstop Brandon Jackson led the team with a .312 batting average, while outfielder Shannon Carter stole a team-leading 33 bases. Marcos Sandoval led the Suns with 163.2 innings pitched, while Travis Hubbel posted a 3.89 ERA in 19 starts. Matt Ford, a 19-year-old left-hander, went 5–3 with a 3.87 ERA in 18 games, 14 of which were starts. He struck out 86 batters in 83 innings with the team. Rob Hamman picked up 8 wins while pitching in 34 games, but only one of them was a start. The most unusual aspect of the season was the bench–clearing brawl that occurred in July against the Columbus Red Stixx at Municipal Stadium. The Suns were losing when Reed Johnson was hit by a pitch that caused outfielder Auntwan Riggins to charge the pitcher from the dugout. The brawl led to so many ejections that Columbus was unable to field a full team and had to forfeit the game to the Suns. Officially, Hagerstown was declared the game's winner by a 9–1 score.

San Francisco Giants (2001–2004) 
The 2001 season brought on a lot of changes for the Hagerstown Suns. After eight seasons with the Toronto Blue Jays, the team switched its parent club to the San Francisco Giants. The team was also sold to Andy Rayburn. On the field, the Suns returned to winning. The offense got power from Dan Trumble, who led the team with 26 home runs. Outfielder Jason Ellison put together a good season, as he batted .291 with a team leading 19 stolen bases in 130 games. Adam Shabala would post a solid .313 batting average in a span of 70 games. The pitching staff was the best that the Suns had since joining the South Atlantic League, as two pitchers won over 10 games. Boof Bonser tied the Suns' record for wins in a season with 16, while losing just 4 games. He also struck out 178 batters in 134 innings, earning him the South Atlantic League Pitcher of the Year Award. Another player with 10 plus wins was Jeff Clark. Clark would go 14–9 while posting a solid 3.65 Earned Run Average (ERA) in 27 games. The most impressive season for the Suns may have come out of the bullpen, as closer Jackson Markert put together a memorable year. Markert broke the Suns' save record by picking up 39 saves and posting a 2.82 ERA. His success was a big reason why the Suns advanced to the playoffs. After winning the Northern Division second-half title, the Suns entered the playoffs, but came up short as Lexington swept them in two games.

The Suns missed the playoffs in 2002, suffering a losing record. Tyler Von Schell led the Suns in home runs with 14. Julian Benavidez led the way in RBIs. Brandon Florence may have been the best all-around hitter on the team with an batting average of .303, with 11 home runs, and 63 RBI in 109 games. On the pitching side, Anthony Pannone led the Suns with nine wins and led innings pitched with 168.2. Ryan Hannaman put together a nice season with a 2.80 ERA and 145 strikeouts in 131.2 innings. Suns fans also saw a glimpse of what was to come with Francisco Liriano. Liriano went 3–6, but had a 3.59 ERA and struck out 85 batters in 80 innings as an 18-year-old. The Suns finished 20.5 games back of the first place, and eventual league champions Hickory Crawdads. Mandalay Entertainment Group purchased the team from Andy Rayburn.

The team scraped together a winning season in 2003 but did not make the playoffs. The Suns' best power hitter in 2003 was Carlos Sosa, who led the team in both homeruns and RBI with 10 and 63. Derin McMains hit a solid .289 in 54 games before he was promoted to High-A San Jose. Brian Buscher would come to the Suns in the second half and hit .275 in 54 games. The strength of the Suns in 2003 lied in their pitching staff, in which several pitchers had great seasons. Merkin Valdez went 9–5 with a 2.25 ERA in 26 starts. He also led the Suns in innings pitched with 156, and strikeouts with 166. Josh Habel led the team with 11 wins in 36 games, 16 of which were starts. Habel also accumulated 127 strikeouts in 122 innings. Brian Stirm was also solid, as he went 8–5 with a 2.86 ERA in 17 games. Other noteworthy starters for the Suns in 2003 were Clay Hensley and Matt Cain. Hensley went 4–3 with 3.18 ERA in 12 starts before he was promoted to High–A San Jose, but one start in particular was noteworthy. On May 3, 2003, Hensley threw the Suns' only perfect game. He did this by retiring 21 consecutive batters in the second game of a double header against the Kannapolis Intimidators. Meanwhile, Matt Cain went 4–4 in 14 starts with the Suns, while posting a 2.55 ERA. He struck out 90 batters in just 74 innings. In the bullpen, Matt Palmer would have a great season as he went 5–0 with a 1.20 ERA and 25 saves. The Suns pitching staff in 2003 stands out among the best in franchise history.

The 2004 season turned out to be one of the worst seasons for the Suns. They finished in last place in the South Atlantic League North Division, 34.5 games behind the eventual league champion Hickory Crawdads. In his short stay with the team, Nate Schierholtz proved to be the best hitter. He batted .289 with 15 homeruns and 54 RBI in just 59 games. Another productive hitter on the team that year was Travis Ishikawa. Ishikawa had exactly the same home run and RBI total as Schierholtz, with a .257 average in 97 games. Both players were promoted to High-A San Jose before the season's end. Designated hitter Jason Columbus led the team in RBI with 87. The Suns' leader in wins was Juan Serrato, who compiled 8 wins in 26 games, 21 of which were starts. The Suns' best all-around pitcher in 2004 was reliever Joe Bateman. Bateman went 7–5 with a 2.14 ERA in 36 games. He picked up 81 strikeouts in just 70 innings of work before he was promoted to Double-A Norwich. One pitcher of note in the Suns bullpen was Brian Wilson. Wilson's numbers in Hagerstown were not impressive, 2–5 with a 5.34 ERA in 23 games and 3 starts. However, Wilson's later major league performances earned him a spot in the Hagerstown Suns Hall of Fame.

New York Mets (2005–2006) 
Hagerstown once again changed affiliates in 2005, initiating a two-year stint with the New York Mets. Minor League Baseball teams are known for their promotions, and the Suns had one consistent with the cold weather that Hagerstown has early in the baseball season. The Suns unveiled their "Eskimo Day" promotion including giving every fan a free ice cube and granting free admission to fans indigenous to Alaska, Canada, or any place where Eskimos are part of the culture. There was also a special contest for fans at the ballpark: guessing how long it would take a bucket of ice to melt. On the field, the season began with a seven-game winning streak. On May 8, Hagerstown and Asheville combined for 35 runs in the Suns' 19–16 victory. Hagerstown broke a 16–16 tie with three runs in the 12th inning. The clubs set a South Atlantic League record with 20 extra-base hits, while the 41 hits–23 for Hagerstown—matched a league mark. Also in May, Hagerstown committed seven errors in a game against Delmarva. In June, the Suns qualified for the playoffs in dramatic fashion. Pitcher Gaby Hernandez's 115–pitch no-hitter in a 1–0 win over the West Virginia Power on June 19 set up a one-game playoff between the Suns and Lexington Legends on June 25 for the first-half crown. Both teams completed the first–half regular schedule with 42–28 records. In the one game playoff, the Suns defeated the Legends, 9–4, with Hernandez again taking the mound and the win. The Suns slumped badly during the second half of the season, finishing last in the Northern Division. In September however, Hagerstown won the Northern Division by defeating the second-half Northern Division champion Delmarva Shorebirds two games to one. The Suns were ultimately unsuccessful in their quest for the South Atlantic League championship, losing to the Kannapolis Intimidators, three games to one.

The Suns' prowess in promotions was recognized in 2006 with the award of the "Veeckie" Award from ESPN The Magazine for their "They even gave away the Kitchen Sink" kitchen sink giveaway promotion. The award, named after famous baseball promoter Bill Veeck, is given annually by the magazine to recognize the industry's top promotions each season. The Suns have received a "Veeckie" in three of the previous five years. Earlier winning promotions included the Guinness World Record for the Youngest Broadcaster ever (2002) and the Free Funeral Giveaway (2003), which was also selected as the Promotion of the Year by ESPN the Magazine and was named as one of the top five baseball promotions of all time by Sports Illustrated. The most noteworthy event on the field was an 8–7 loss at Lakewood, a 22-inning marathon that took nearly a week and a half to complete. The game began on April 26, but was called in the 17th inning due to league rules that state an inning cannot be started after 12:30 a.m. It was finally completed on May 6, taking 7 hours and 47 minutes. The 22 innings bested the previous 21-inning South Atlantic League record.

Washington Nationals (2007–2020) 
In 2007, the Suns became a member of the Washington Nationals farm system. The Suns won few games as the talent-poor Nationals organization rapidly promoted Suns players with potential. Of four players selected for the South Atlantic League All-Star Game (Leonard Davis, Cory VanAllen, Mike Daniel, and Chris Marrero), none actually played because they had been promoted to the Class A-Advanced Potomac Nationals by the time the game occurred. In the promotions area, romance novelist Nora Roberts was honored with a Nora Roberts bobblehead on July 6. Roberts is a resident of Washington County, Maryland, where Hagerstown is located and has been honored by the Suns several times.

There were two significant milestones for the Suns organization in 2008. The first occurred on May 30, when the number 50 was retired in honor of in honor of SAL President Emeritus John Henry Moss. Along with the number-retiring ceremony, the Suns honored Moss with a bronze plaque placed in Municipal Stadium, highlighting his 50 years of service to the league. The second milestone occurred on November 13 when Hagerstown native and Suns Director of Business Operations Carol Gehr was selected as the Rawlings Woman Executive of the Year. The Rawlings Award honors an outstanding woman executive from either Major League or Minor League Baseball. Gehr was with the club in many capacities over a 25-year career spanning six different ownership groups.

A bright spot to an otherwise dismal season in 2009 was the performance of catcher Derek Norris. He led the SAL with a .413 on-base percentage and 90 walks while being named the SAL's Most Outstanding Major League Prospect. He also finished among the top five in the SAL in homers (23), extra-base hits (53), RBIs (84), runs (78), and slugging percentage (.513). He was selected as the designated hitter to the Class A Topps/MiLB All-Star Team, which includes both A-Advanced and A level leagues.

On July 15, 2010, Hagerstown players Steven Souza and J.R. Higley were suspended for using performance-enhancing drugs. Each received 50-game suspensions after testing positive for methylphenidate and ritalinic acid, performance-enhancing substances in violation of the Minor League Drug Prevention and Treatment Program. Souza was a 2010 SAL All-Star. On the field, Eury Perez's four stolen bases in seven innings against Delmarva on August 19 was nominated as one of the Class A games of the year for 2010. Finally, a new ownership group with local ties, Hagerstown Baseball, LLC, purchased the Suns in September 2010 for a reported $6.7 million from Mandalay Sports Entertainment. Mandalay used proceeds of the sale to purchase the Oklahoma City Redhawks Triple-A franchise. The new ownership group is led by Florida businessman and general manager of Polo Trace Country Club Bruce Quinn; Tony Dahbura, corporate vice president of Hub Labels in Hagerstown; Dr. Mitesh Kothari of Hagerstown; and Quinn's sister, Sheri.

Two number one draft picks dominated the news for the Hagerstown Suns in 2011. Bryce Harper, the overall first pick in the 2010 Major League Baseball draft, started the season with the Suns. Before he moved to the Double-A Harrisburg Senators in mid-season, he played well enough to be selected for the SAL All-Star Game. Later in the season, the 2009 Major League Baseball draft overall first pick, Stephen Strasburg, pitched at Hagerstown on a rehabilitation assignment.

The 2012 season had a tragic beginning when Mitchell Akers, an 18-year-old high school senior who was working with the team, died on April 11. Sources within the league said he fell off the back of a John Deere Gator at Municipal Stadium and later died from his injuries. On the field, 2012 proved to be a banner year for Suns third baseman Matt Skole. He led the SAL in home runs (27), bases on balls (94), on base percentage (.438), and slugging percentage (.574). In addition, Skole was also elected as the Nationals' Minor League Player of the Year and the SAL Player of the Year. The Suns made the divisional playoffs; however, they were swept by the defending SAL champion Greensboro Grasshoppers, two games to none.  Discussions concerning the relocation of the Hagerstown Suns to Virginia began circulating. A letter from the Washington Nationals was sent to Suns majority owner Bruce Quinn stating that Hagerstown's 80-year-old Municipal Stadium was no longer up to Major League Baseball standards.  Initially, Quinn began discussions with the Winchester Economic Development Authority to relocate the team to Winchester, Virginia, to begin play in 2014. The negotiations failed in part because of the refusal of the Winchester community to provide public funding for a new stadium

In 2013, Hagerstown led the SAL in the offensive categories of runs scored (692), runs batted in (608), and on base percentage (.341). Improving over 2012, the Suns won the SAL Northern Division, but fell to the Savannah Sand Gnats, three games to one in the league championship. Tony Renda was selected as the initial recipient of the Bob Boone Award, granted to the Washington Nationals' minor league player "who best demonstrates the professionalism, leadership, loyalty, passion, selflessness, durability, determination, and work ethic required to play the game the Washington Nationals way."  In October 2013, the Suns formally applied to Minor League Baseball to relocate to Fredericksburg, Virginia, for the 2015 season. The Suns and their partners, New Jersey-based Diamond Nation and a Fredericksburg-area automotive company, agreed to purchase a 38-acre stadium site inside the Fredericksburg city limits. The facility was initially planned to be ready for the start of the 2015 season at a cost of $29 million. However, in November 2014 Diamond Nation announced that it was terminating its option to purchase the Suns. A contributing factor in this decision was the increase in estimated cost to build the facility to $53 million.

Hagerstown began the 2014 season with a record of 31 wins and 8 losses, which was the highest winning percentage in the minor leagues. However, the team then went 13–18, finishing with a first-half season record of 44–26. The Greensboro Grasshoppers shared the 44–26 record. However, because Greensboro defeated Hagerstown in three out of four games during the first-half season, Greensboro was awarded the SAL Northern Division first half title. The second-half season proved to be a repeat of the first. Once again, Greensboro and Hagerstown finished in a tie for first, this time with identical 43–27 records. The tie breaker system worked in the Suns' favor this time, because Hagerstown won five of seven games against Greensboro in the second half. Shining brightest among the Suns' everyday players in 2014 was SAL Most Valuable Player Wilmer Difo. The middle infielder led the SAL with 176 hits, placed second with 49 stolen bases, and fourth with 90 runs batted in. Additionly, Difo was the recipient of the 2014 Bob Boone Award. Fellow SAL End-of-Season All-Star Rafael Bautista led the league with 69 steals. The pitching was also a team strength, led by Lucas Giolito who was honored as the league's top pitcher and top major league prospect. The Suns improved their playoff performance over 2013, but it was still not enough to claim the John Henry Moss Cup, symbolic of the SAL championship. The Suns lost the SAL championship series, three games to two, to the Asheville Tourists.

The most unusual game of 2015 occurred on April 15 when the Suns won a 1–0 game against the West Virginia Power despite having no hits. The lone run in the game crossed the plate in the top of the first inning. The Suns loaded the bases after being issued two walks and one batter getting hit. With two outs, left fielder Jeff Gardner drew a walk to force home right fielder Narciso Mesa from third to score the only run of the game. This was the first minor league no-hitter resulting in defeat in a full-season league since 2008.  During the year Suns majority owner Bruce Quinn entered into negotiations with Spotsylvania County, Virginia officials to move the Suns. Quinn proposed a 5,000-seat, $30 million stadium, with $28 million borrowed by the county and $2 million paid by the Suns, who would pay a rent of $175,000 annually. Minor League Baseball gave Quinn until July 31 to complete the deal. The deadline passed with no further action.

The 2016 campaign saw a return to postseason play for Hagerstown as the Suns won the first-half Northern Division title by one-half game over the Delmarva Shorebirds. In the Northern Division championship the Suns were swept 2–0 by the Lakewood BlueClaws. The Suns SAL End-of-Season All-Stars were Kevin Gutierrez (third base), Ian Sagdall (utility infielder), and Patrick Anderson (manager).

There were several noteworthy games during the 2017 season. On April 30, the Suns set a single-game record SAL record with 30 hits in a 22 to 4 victory over the Lexington Legends. Hagerstown and Lexington also tied the SAL record of 42 combined hits during the game. Games from June 1 to June 4 set a four-game series attendance record (22,578) at Municipal Stadium as Tim Tebow visited Hagerstown with the Columbia Fireflies. On June 7, Hagerstown and the Greensboro Grasshoppers played a game at Burlington, North Carolina's Burlington Athletic Stadium, home of the short-season rookie Appalachian League Burlington Royals. This was the first full-season Class A game in Burlington since 1964. On Father's Day (June 18) in Lexington, inclement weather caused the Suns and Legends to end their game in an unusual 5 to 5 tie.  Ross Combs was recognized as the SAL Sales Executive of the Year.

In 2018, Brandon Groomes was recognized as the SAL Batperson of the Year for the fourth year in a row.

2019 was noteworthy in three respects.  It was the last year the Suns fielded a team.  Patrick Anderson had a record breaking sixth year managing the team.  Finally, the Suns had a record low attendance of 59,686 fans during the season.

Team folds 
Following the cancelled 2020 season, the team announced in an email to season ticket holders on November 21, 2020, that the Washington Nationals were not renewing their affiliation with the Suns.  Team General Manager Travis Painter noted "It is with a heavy heart that I’m writing to let you know that the Washington Nationals have decided not to renew their affiliation with the Hagerstown Suns. This brings 40 years of Hagerstown Suns baseball to a close." On December 9, 2020, the Nationals announced that the Fredericksburg Nationals, formerly the Potomac Nationals of Woodbridge, Virginia, would take over as the club's Low-A affiliate. As part of the minor league restructuring process, Major League Baseball did not invite the Suns to affiliate at any level or with any team, formally ending affiliated minor league baseball in Hagerstown.

South Atlantic League All-Stars and season leaders

Major league Baseball (MLB) players who played for the South Atlantic League (SAL) Suns

Note:  MLB players with Carolina League or Eastern League Suns experience can be found at History of the Hagerstown Suns

List of Hagerstown Suns individual records

Note:  These records also include Suns players from the Carolina League era (1981–1988).  Suns Double-A records are at History of the Hagerstown Suns.

Rivals
The Suns had an in-state rivalry with the Delmarva Shorebirds, an affiliate of the Baltimore Orioles. This particular rivalry was also fueled by the regional rivalry between the two parent clubs.

Hagerstown Suns South Atlantic League (SAL) Team Season-by-Season Record

Further reading
Johnson, Lloyd and Wolff, Miles, editors: Encyclopedia of Minor League Baseball. Durham, North Carolina Publisher: Baseball America, 2007. Format: Hardback, 767 pp.

References

External links
 Statistics from Baseball-Reference

Hagerstown Suns
Baseball teams established in 1981
Baseball teams disestablished in 2020
Defunct South Atlantic League teams
Defunct Eastern League (1938–present) teams
Carolina League teams
Defunct baseball teams in Maryland
Sports in Hagerstown, Maryland
Washington Nationals minor league affiliates
New York Mets minor league affiliates
San Francisco Giants minor league affiliates
Toronto Blue Jays minor league affiliates
Baltimore Orioles minor league affiliates
1981 establishments in Maryland
2020 disestablishments in Maryland